Alyaksandr Danilaw (born 10 September 1980) is a Belarusian former football defender.

Honours
Gomel
Belarusian Premier League champion: 2003
Belarusian Cup champion: 2001–02

External links
 
 
 

1980 births
Living people
Sportspeople from Gomel
Belarusian footballers
Association football defenders
Belarusian expatriate footballers
Expatriate footballers in Ukraine
Belarusian expatriate sportspeople in Ukraine
Expatriate footballers in Latvia
Ukrainian Premier League players
FC ZLiN Gomel players
FC Gomel players
FC Metalurh Donetsk players
FC Metalist Kharkiv players
FC Arsenal Kyiv players
FC Desna Pohreby players
FC Dinamo Minsk players